Akhmatov Fjord, also known as Akhmatov Bay (Zaliv Akhmatova), is a fjord in Severnaya Zemlya, Krasnoyarsk Krai, Russia. This fjord is clogged by ice most of the year.

History
The fjord was named in 1913 after the Russian hydrographer who surveyed it in the course of the Arctic Ocean Hydrographic Expedition led by Boris Vilkitsky on behalf of the Russian Hydrographic Service.

Geography
Akhmatov Fjord is a fjord with a wide entrance in the northeastern area of Bolshevik Island, the southernmost island of Severnaya Zemlya. It is located southeast of Cape Unslicht on the Laptev Sea shore of the island, east of Mikoyan Bay.

The fjord extends in a roughly northeast/southwest direction for about 56 km. The basin inside the fjord has smooth mountains on both sides. Near the mouth Akhmatov Fjord is about 17 km wide, and the inner fjord becomes narrower, averaging 5 km in width.
Lishny Island and Yuzhny Island —among other smaller islands, lie on the eastern side of the area near the mouth of the fjord that forms a wide bay.

See also
List of fjords of Russia

References

External links

Eurasian Arctic Tectonics - DiVA
New geochronological data on Palaeozoic igneous activity and deformation in the Severnaya Zemlya Archipelago, Russia, and implications for the development of the Eurasian Arctic margin, Geological Magazine

Fjords of Severnaya Zemlya
Bodies of water of the Laptev Sea